The World Figure Skating Championships is an annual figure skating competition sanctioned by the International Skating Union in which figure skaters compete for the title of World Champion.

Men's competitions took place from 16 to 17 February in Manchester, United Kingdom. Ladies' competitions took place from 27 to 28 January in Davos, Switzerland. Pairs' competition took place on 27 February also in Manchester, United Kingdom.

Results

Men

Judges:
 Jeno Minich 
 H. Günther 
 G. Helfrich 
 E. S. Hirst 
 Louis Magnus 
 Horatio Torromé 
 Herbert R. Yglesias

Ladies

Judges:
 J. Keiller Greig 
 Louis Magnus 
 H. Günther 
 Josef Fellner 
 P. Birum

Pairs

Judges:
 Jeno Minich 
 H. Günther 
 G. Helfrich 
 Horatio Torromé 
 Herbert R. Yglesias

Sources
 Result List provided by the ISU

World Figure Skating Championships
World Figure Skating Championships, 1912
International figure skating competitions hosted by Switzerland
International figure skating competitions hosted by the United Kingdom
Sport in Davos
International sports competitions in Manchester
World Figure Skating Championships
World Figure Skating Championships
World Figure Skating Championships
World Figure Skating Championships
1910s in Manchester